Trapezites atkinsi, the speckled ochre skipper, is a butterfly of the family Hesperiidae. It is found along the south-western coast of Western Australia.

The larvae feed on Acanthocarpus preissii.

External links
 CSIRO Entomology
 Australian Faunal Directory

Trapezitinae
Butterflies described in 1998